Bodil Kjer (2 September 1917 – 1 February 2003) was a Danish actress whose talent and charisma earned her status as a Primadonna and the title of first lady of Danish theater. Kjer's leading roles reflect the span of Denmark's modern cinema: such as the artistic maturity of the war-torn 1940s in Jenny and the Soldier, the light-hearted romance of the 1950s and 1960s in Mød mig på Cassiopeia, the action drama of the 1970s in Strømer, and the modern epic tale in Babette's Feast (1987). Denmark's highest film prize, the Bodil Awards, were named in honor of Kjer and Bodil Ipsen. Kjer twice received her namesake award for Best Actress (1948, 1952) and once for Best Supporting Actress (1977). In 1997, she accepted an honorary Bodil for lifetime achievement.

Biography 
Bodil Valborg Karen Ellen Leland Kjer was born 2 September 1917 in Odense, Denmark. Kjer died on 1 February 2003.

Filmography (selected)

References

External links 
 

1917 births
2003 deaths
Best Actress Bodil Award winners
Danish film actresses
People from Odense
Best Supporting Actress Bodil Award winners
Bodil Honorary Award recipients